This is a list of notable people with the given name Susan.

Notable people named Susan
Susan (Iranian singer) (1942–2004), born Golandam Taherkhani, an Iranian singer
Susan (Japanese singer), pop singer who recorded in Japan in the early 1980s
Susan, Lady Renouf (1942–2016), Australian socialite
Susan, Lady St Helier (1845–1931), London County Council alderman
Susan Ariel Aaronson, American author, public speaker, and academic
Susan Abod (born 1951), American feminist activist and musician
Susan Abrams (born 1964), Chief Executive Officer of the Illinois Holocaust Museum and Education Center
Susan Abulhawa (born 1970), Palestinian American writer and human rights activist
Susan Aceron (1972–2016), Canadian actress and businesswoman
Susan Aglukark (born 1967), Inuk musician
Susan Aho (born 1974), Finnish singer 
Susan Aitken, Scottish National Party politician
Susan Alberts, American primatologist, anthropologist and biologist, professor at Duke University
Susan Albright, American journalist and editor
Susan Alexander-Max, American-born British fortepianist
Susan Alexjander, American sound artist, musical composer, and teacher
Susan Allen (born 1963), Minnesota politician
Susan Almy (born 1946), New Hampshire politician
Susan Amara, American professor of neuroscience
Susan B. Anthony (1820–1906), American feminist and suffragist of the 19th century
Susan Anton (born 1950), American actress
Susan Arnold (born 1954), American businesswoman
Susan Atefat-Peckham (1970–2004), Iranian-American poet
Susan Austin, American politician
Susan Avery (born 1950), American atmospheric physicist
Susan Avingaq, Inuk Canadian film director, producer, screenwriter, and actress
Susan Backlinie (born 1946), American actress and stuntwoman
Susan Badders (born 1951), American fencer
Susan Baer (1950–2016), American public servant
Susan Bailey (born 1950), British psychiatrist and academic
Susan Baker (born 1955), British professor of political science
Susan Hammond Barney (1834–1922), American evangelist, writer 
Susan Bay (born 1943), American actress
Susan Bernal (born 1982), Colombian materials scientist
Susan Bertie, Countess of Kent (born 1554), English aristocrat
Sue Bird (born 1980), American basketball player
Susan Bissell, Canadian academic, UNICEF's Child Protection Section chief
Susan Boyle (born 1961), Scottish singer
Susan Brookes (born c.1943/44), English television chef
Susan Alice Buffett (born 1953), daughter of Warren Buffett
Susan Cain (born 1968), American author of Quiet: The Power of Introverts... and Bittersweet
Susan Calman (born 1974), Scottish comedian
Susan Cheever (born 1943), American author
Susan Collett (born 1961), Canadian artist
Susan Jane Colley (born 1959), American mathematician
Susan Cookson (born 1965), British actress
Susan Coppersmith (born 1957), American physicist
Susan Elizabeth Wood Crocker (1836–?), American physician
Susan B. Davidson, American computer scientist
Susan Shaw Devesa (born 1944), American cancer epidemiologist 
Susan Dew Hoff (1842-1933), American physician
Susan Ann Dimock, Canadian philosopher and professor
Susan Cushman (born 1972), Canadian rhythmic gymnast
Susan Darcy (born 1956), American test pilot
Susan Dey (born 1952), American actress
Susan S. Ellenberg, American biostatistician
Susan Enriquez, Filipina broadcast journalist
Susan Frances Nelson Ferree (1844–1919), American journalist, temperance worker and social activist
Susan Fessenden (1840–1932), American activist, reformer 
Susan Ford, daughter of the U.S. President Gerald Ford
Susan B. Ganong (1873–1961), Canadian educator and proprietor of the Netherwood School
Susan Shur-Fen Gau (born 1962), Taiwanese psychiatrist and academic
Susan Gerbic (born 1963), American skeptical activist
Susan K. Gregurick, American computational chemist
Susan Hampshire (born 1937), English actress
Susan Ashbrook Harvey (born 1953), American professor of Byzantine and early Christian studies
Susan Hayward (1917–1975), American actress
Susan Helms (born 1958), American astronaut
Susan Hendl (1947–2020), American ballet dancer and répétiteur
Susan Heyward, American actress 
Susan Hill (born 1942), British author
Susan Ieraci (born 1960), Australian doctor and emergency specialist
Susan Isaacs (born 1943), American author
Susan Keefe, American anthropologist and author
Susan G. Komen, American breast cancer victim at 36, whose sister named a foundation after her
Susan B. Landau (1952–2017), American film producer, television producer, talent manager, and photographer
Susan Lewis (writer) (born 1956), English author
Susan Littler (1947–1982), English actress
Susan Lucci (born 1946), American actress
Susan Nudelman (known as Suzi Ferrer) (1940–2006), US/Puerto-Rican visual artist and feminist
Susan A. Martinis (born 1963), American biochemist
Susan McFadden (born 1983), Irish actress and singer
Susan Mikula, American artist and photographer
Susan B. Millar, senior scientist at the Wisconsin Center for Education Research
Susan B. Neuman, American educator, researcher, and education policy-maker
Susan Newell (1893–1923), last woman to be hanged in Scotland
Susan Oliver (1932–1990), American actress, director, and aviator
Susan Oseloff (born 2006), German singer who represented Germany in the Junior Eurovision Song Contest 2020
Susan Polgar (born 1969), Hungarian-American grandmaster chess player
Susie Porter (born 1970 or 1971), Australian television, film and theatre actress.
Suzi Quatro (born 1950), American actress, singer-songwriter and musician
Susan Quimpo (1961–2020), Filipina activist and writer
Susan Reutzel-Edens, American chemist and Head of Science at the Cambridge Crystallographic Data Centre
Susan Roces (1941-2022), Filipina actress
Susan Roman (born 1957), Canadian voice actress
Susan Saint James (born 1946), American actress
Susan Augusta Pike Sanders (1842–1931), American teacher, clubwoman, and author
Susan Sarandon (born 1946), American actress
Susan Fromberg Schaeffer (1941–2011), American author
Susan Polis Schutz (born 1944), American poet and greeting card writer
Susan Silver (born 1958), American music manager
Siouxsie Sioux (born 1957), English musician 
Susan Sizemore (1951–2020), American novelist
Susan Smith (born 1971), American murderer who drowned her two sons
Susan Somers-Willett, American author
Susan Sontag (1933–2004), American author, theorist, and political activist
Susan Marr Spalding (1841–1908), American poet
Susan J. Swift Steele (1822–1895), American social reformer
Susan Ann Sulley (born 1963), British singer with The Human League
Susan Sullivan (disambiguation), several people
Susan Tooby (born 1960), Welsh long-distance runner
Susan Archer Weiss (1822–1917), American poet, author, artist
Susan R. Wilson (1948–2020), Australian statistician
Susan H. Wixon (1839–1912), American freethought writer, editor, feminist, and educator
Susan Wojcicki (born 1968), American business executive, third CEO of YouTube

Fictional characters
Susan Ashwood, a blind medium from Manchester, UK, from the Power of Five series
Susan Bishop, in the second season of Siren
Susan Bones, character in Harry Potter.
Susan Bunch, in the TV series Friends
Susan Calvin, robopsychologist in the I, Robot series
Susan Delgado, from The Dark Tower series
Susan Foreman, a recurring character in Doctor Who
Susan Heffley, in the book series Diary of a Wimpy Kid
Susan Sto Helit, a Discworld character
Susan Henchard, in Thomas Hardy's 1886 novel The Mayor Of Casterbridge
Susan Keane, the main character in the TV series Suddenly Susan
Susan Kennedy, a main character in the soap opera Neighbours
Susan Lewis, doctor on the television show ER
Susan Mayer, a main character in the TV series Desperate Housewives
Susan Moore, character from 1978–1983 on the American soap opera General Hospital
Susan Mortlake, from the Power of Five series
Susan Murphy/Ginormica, a cartoon character voiced by Reese Witherspoon in the 2009 film Monsters vs. Aliens
Susan Neville, in the 1986 TV action movie The Gladiator
Susan Pevensie, a main character in The Chronicles of Narnia
Susan Robinson, one of the original residents of 123 Sesame Street, played by Loretta Long
Susan Ross, NBC executive and the fiancé of George Costanza on the television show Seinfeld
Susie Salmon, in The Lovely Bones 
Susan Storm, a comic book superheroine in the Marvel Universe
Susan Strong, in the television series Adventure Time
Susan, in the television series Steven Universe

Susan